Keno Auctions, founded in 2009 by celebrity antiques dealer Leigh Keno, is a full-service auction house in New York City.

References

External links

Companies based in New York City
Auction houses based in New York City
American companies established in 2009
Retail companies established in 2009